Hrazany is a municipality and village in Písek District in the South Bohemian Region of the Czech Republic. It has about 300 inhabitants.

Administrative parts
Villages of Dobrošov, Hrazánky and Klisinec are administrative parts of Hrazany.

Etymology
The name of the village has no clear origin, it was derived from the Czech word hráz (i.e. "dyke") or hrad (i.e. "castle").

Geography

It lies in the Vlašim Uplands.

Near the village of Hrazany there is the Kněz u Hrazan Nature Monument. It is a blockfield, a remnant of the glacial age.

History
The first written mention of Hrazany and Hrazánky is from 1373. The village of Dobrošov was first mentioned in 1216.

Sights
Almost no original buildings have been preserved. The only monuments are the chapels. The oldest one is the Chapel of Sain John of Nepomuk in Hrazánky from the 19th century. The Chapel of the Holy Spirit in Hrazany dates from 1926 and the Chapel of Saint Wenceslaus in Dobrošov dates from 1932.

References

External links

Villages in Písek District